Armen Hambardzumyan (born 18 August 1958) is an Armenian actor and producer. Hambardzumyan was awarded the Golden Medal of the Ministry of Culture of the RA as well as the Certificate of the Ministry of Defense of the RA.

Life

Armen Hambardzumyan was born on 18 August 1958 (10 August on passport) in Yerevan. From 1965 to 1975, Hambardzumyan studied in number 55 school after Chekhov and then in number 20 school after Dzerzhinsky. From 1975 to 1978, Hambardzumyan worked as electrician at the Yerevan City Telephone Net then as a secretary of Young Communist Organization of YerCTN. In 1978 entered Yerevan State Medical Institute. After graduation worked as a doctor in Central Regional Hospital of Ejmiatsin until 1989. 1989–1992 worked as a dermatologist at the student clinic. From 1979–1989 during the years of study at the Medical Institute participated in the founding, establishing and creative development of the Chamber Theater of Yerevan acting as an actor, director and administrator.

Played the following lead roles in the Chamber Theater; Hamlet (Hamlet by W. Shakespeare), Claude Eatherly (Claude by P. Zeytuntsyan), Slave (Theater of Nero's and Seneca's period by Edvard Radzinsky) as well as he acted in almost all plays based on A. Yernjakyan's works staged in the Chamber Theater. From 1992–1995 Armen Hambardzumyan was financial Director of Goyak commercial art-trade association. In those years took part in the founding and establishing of Goyak experimental theater-laboratory. In the meantime he organized post-modern Armenian painters' exhibitions in Yugoslavia, Russia and Czechoslovakia. From 1995 until present Armen Hambardzumyan is engaged in producing activities.

Career

Works and Tours

References

External links 
 
 Armen Hambardzumyan's interview

Armenian film producers
1958 births
Living people